Fall Be Kind is the fourth EP by American experimental pop band Animal Collective. It was released digitally in MP3 and WAV formats on November 23, 2009, and as both a CD and LP in the United Kingdom on December 14, 2009 and in the United States on December 15, 2009. Some stores in Australia and New Zealand began selling it more than a week earlier, due to the band's touring presence there at the time.

On November 18, 2009, Domino Records accidentally sent pre-ordered CDs of Fall Be Kind to customers before the actual release date, resulting in a lossless digital version leaking, in its entirety, onto the internet.

Recorded by Ben H. Allen at Sweet Tea in Oxford in February 2008 and at Mission Sound in Brooklyn in August 2009, Fall Be Kind includes live favorites "Graze" and "What Would I Want? Sky". The latter track contains a sample of "Unbroken Chain" by the Grateful Dead, the first ever licensed sample of a Grateful Dead recording. The cover depicts a statue photographed through a brown paper bag attached to the camera lens.

Critical reception

Fall Be Kind was met with generally favorable reviews by critics. At Metacritic, the album received an average score of 84, based on 21 reviews, which indicates "universal acclaim". Lewis P. from Sputnikmusic claimed "it had the impossible task of following up one of the most hyped albums of this decade and yet it barely breaks a sweat." He went on to give a perfect rating.

Track listing

Sample credits
 "Graze" incorporates elements of "Ardeleana", arranged and performed by Gheorghe Zamfir.
 "What Would I Want? Sky" features samples of "Unbroken Chain", written by Phil Lesh and Robert Petersen and performed by the Grateful Dead.

Personnel
Credits adapted from liner notes.

Animal Collective
 Avey Tare
 Geologist
 Panda Bear

Additional personnel
 Ben Allen – mixing, recording
 Animal Collective – mixing
 Rob Carmichael – design and layout
 Aaron Ersoy – recording assistance
 Andy Marcinkowski – recording assistance
 Heather McIntosh – cello on "Graze" and "Bleed"

References

External links
 Animal Collective's Avey Tare Reveals All About New EP, Film, Tour Hiatus
 New Animal Collective EP

2009 EPs
Animal Collective EPs
Domino Recording Company EPs